Barker–Lane Stadium is a multi-purpose stadium in Buies Creek, North Carolina. The stadium is located on the campus of Campbell University and hosts the school's American football and women's lacrosse programs. The stadium was scheduled to be completed in stages with the first stage to include the field, the field house, the main entrance, the bowl, seating for 5,000 spectators and necessary road realignment. Barker-Lane received a major expansion in 2013 with the construction of the West stand that increased capacity to 5,500. In 2016, a state-of-the-art HD Daktronics video board was added to the north endzone. In 2018, new field turf was installed with a completely revamped midfield logo just in time for the 2018 Campbell Fighting Camels season kickoff. The first scoring play in Barker–Lane Stadium was a field goal kicked by Adam Willets. Barker-Lane Stadium is considered by many to have one of the best gameday atmospheres in all of Division I FCS football. In their six home games last fall, the Fighting Camels averaged a sellout crowd with 5,523 fans per game. By drawing 101 percent over its capacity of 5,500, Barker-Lane Stadium ranked in the Top 10 in all Division I football — both the FCS and FBS — in attendance over capacity.

Football attendance records

See also
 List of NCAA Division I FCS football stadiums

References

External links
Campbell Athletic Facilities
Campbell University Profile

College football venues
American football venues in North Carolina
Campbell Fighting Camels football
Multi-purpose stadiums in the United States
Sports venues in Harnett County, North Carolina
2008 establishments in North Carolina
Sports venues completed in 2008